Harker Hall, also known as the Chemical Laboratory, is a historic building on the campus of the University of Illinois at Urbana–Champaign in Urbana, Illinois. Built in 1877, the building originally served as the university's chemical laboratory. Architect Nathan Clifford Ricker designed the Second Empire building, which originally featured a mansard roof. In 1896, a lightning strike set the roof on fire, and architect James White replaced it with a hip roof. The building was named Harker Hall in honor of Oliver A. Harker, who served as dean of the university's law school from 1903 to 1916. Until it stopped hosting classes, the hall was the oldest classroom building at the university.

The building was added to the National Register of Historic Places on November 19, 1986.

Timeline

References

References

University and college buildings on the National Register of Historic Places in Illinois
Second Empire architecture in Illinois
Buildings and structures completed in 1877
National Register of Historic Places in Champaign County, Illinois
Buildings and structures of the University of Illinois Urbana-Champaign
1877 establishments in Illinois